Charles Carroll Simms (1824–1884) a native of Virginia, became a United States Navy midshipman in 1839. He served in the U.S. Navy for more than two decades, achieving the rank of Lieutenant in 1854. He was dismissed from the service in April 1861, after his state left the United States, and briefly was an officer in Virginia's Navy. Commissioned as a First Lieutenant in the Confederate States Navy in June 1861, during that year he commanded the steamer CSS George Page and was assigned to the steamer CSS Rappahannock. Also commanded CSS Appomattox in coastal North Carolina until it was scuttled in February 1862. As an officer of the ironclad CSS Virginia, he took part in her March–May 1862 actions in the vicinity of Hampton Roads. Subsequently, he served in the gunboats CSS Nansemond on the James River, and CSS Selma in Mobile Bay. During the American Civil War's final year, while assigned to the Mobile Squadron, he commanded the ironclads CSS Baltic and CSS Nashville. First Lieutenant Simms surrendered to Federal forces in early May 1865 and was paroled soon afterwards.

Simms was born 30 Mar 1824 in Virginia to John Douglas Simms and Eleanor Carroll Brent. He married Elizabeth James Nourse about 1852 and he died 18 Dec 1884 in Georgetown, Washington, D. C.  He and his wife are buried in Rock Creek Cemetery in Washington D.C. The Simms family was one of public service.  His father, John Douglass Simms, was a Chief Clerk of the Navy Department and Acting Secretary of the Navy in 1841 with the resignation of George E. Badger. Col. Charles Simms, grandfather of Charles Carroll Simms, was, among other things, an officer in the American Revolution and Mayor of Alexandria, Virginia.

See also

References

This page incorporates text from the public domain U.S. Naval Historical Center.

Confederate States Navy commanders
People from Virginia
United States Navy officers
People of Virginia in the American Civil War
1824 births
1884 deaths